Edwin Imboela Stadium is a multi-use stadium in Lusaka, Zambia.  It is currently used mostly for football matches and serves as the home for Nkwazi F.C. and Kafue Celtic F.C. The stadium holds 6,000 people.

References

Buildings and structures in Lusaka
Football venues in Zambia
Sport in Lusaka